Ellen Gronemeyer (born 1979 in Fulda) is a German contemporary painter and has held a junior professorship at the Kunstakademie Düsseldorf, the academy of fine arts of Germany's federal state of North Rhine Westphalia, since 2017.

Life 
Gronemeyer grew up in Fritzlar, a small German town in northern Hesse with a storied history. After finishing her  secondary education in 1998 she took up studies of Free Art at the Hochschule für bildende Künste Hamburg (HFBK), the University of Fine Arts of Hamburg. Amongst her mentors there were Stephan Dillemuth, Werner Büttner, Bogomir Ecker, Sabeth Buchmann and Daniel Richter. She graduated in 2005 with a diploma.

From 2006 until 2009, Gronemeyer held a teaching position at the Chelsea College of Arts and Design in London.

In 2014, Gronemeyer had her first solo exhibition in a museum at the Ludwig Forum for International Art in Aachen.

In 2017, Gronemeyer was appointed to a junior professorship for painting at the Kunstakademie Düsseldorf.

Since 2009, she has been living in Berlin.

Awards 

 2003: scholarship of the Studienstiftung des deutschen Volkes
 2009: Zeitsicht-art award, Augsburg (juror: Daniel Richter)

Solo exhibitions (selection) 

 2004: Erste Strophe Erste Zeile, Pudelclub/Nomadenoase, Hamburg
 2005: Ellen Gronemeyer, Gallery Karin Günther, Hamburg
 2006: Ich häng Dir Deine Blässe um, greengrassi, London
 2007: Ellen Gronemeyer, (wiht Michael Hakimi) Andrew Kreps, New York
 2009: Drop Me on the Corner, greengrassi, London
 2010: Zeitsichtpreis 2009, Schaetzlerpalais, Augsburg
 2011: CDU/CSU, Galerie Karin Günther, Hamburg
 2012: Affentheater, Kimmerich, New York
 2012: I have a difficult childhood, greengrassi, London
 2014: Ellen Gronemeyer. Watchever, Ludwig Forum für Internationale Kunst, Aachen (mit Katalog)
 2015: Keine Minute Ruhe, greengrassi, London
 2015: Raw and Delirious, Kunsthalle Bern
 2017: Bochum, Kimmerich, Berlin
 2018: frozen, Anton Kern Gallery, New York
 2021: Tausendmal Du, Anton Kern Gallery, New York

Works (Selection) 

 Exclamation-marc, 2015, oil on canvass, 160 × 120 cm, San Francisco Museum of Modern Art

External links 

 Ellen Gronemeyer at Kunstakademie Düsseldorf

References

1979 births
People from Berlin
Academic staff of Kunstakademie Düsseldorf
Contemporary artists
Living people